The 2nd PGA Golden Laurel Awards, honoring the best film and television producers of 1990, were presented at the Beverly Wilshire Hotel in Los Angeles, California on March 5, 1991 after the winners were announced in February. The awards were presented by Ted Turner.

Winners and nominees

Film

Television

Special

References

 1990
1990 film awards
1990 television awards